The Inuit Studies Conference (ISC, alternatively called the Congrès d'Études Inuit, CEI) is a biannual international and multidisciplinary conference, usually held in the fall, at institutions in North America and Europe. Presenters include Elders, university researchers, professionals, artists, and representatives from Inuit communities, governments, and organizations. Presentations focus on all aspects of Inuit society, history, language, and culture, as well as the Inuit homeland, its environment, geography, and ecology.

The Inuit Studies Conference was first held in 1978 and was founded by Bernard Saladin D'Anglure. Conference hosts are chosen by the Inuksiutiit Katimajiit Association. Past editions of the Inuit Studies Conference have been held at the following institutions.

References

Academic conferences
Inuit culture